The Tibetan Centre for Human Rights and Democracy (TCHRD) is a Tibetan non-governmental nonprofit human rights organization.

The TCHRD investigates and reports on human rights issues in Tibet and among Tibetan minorities throughout China. It is the first Tibetan non-governmental human rights organization to be established in exile in India. The TCHRD publishes articles on censorship and discrimination faced by Tibetans in Tibet; keeps databases on Tibetan political prisoners in China, Tibetans who have self-immolated, and Tibetans who have died in detention; and publishes reports and yearly human rights updates. The TCHRD has emphasized that an "important source of support for the Tibetan people comes from the Chinese community from both within and outside China."

Lobsang Nyandak, President of the Tibet Fund and former Representative to the Americas for the Dalai Lama, was the founding Executive Director.

See also

 1959 Tibetan uprising
 1987–1989 Tibetan unrest
 2008 Tibetan unrest
 Panchen Lama
 Palden Gyatso
 Tibetans in exile
 Human rights in Tibet
 Human rights in China
 Laogai criminal justice system, abbreviation of Láodòng Gǎizào (劳动改造),reform through labor penal labor and prison farms
 Labour camps in Tibet
 Drapchi Prison
 Human Rights Watch - China and Tibet
 1987–1989 Tibetan unrest
 2008 Lhasa violence
 2010 Tibetan language protest
 International reactions to 2008 Tibetan protests
 List of prisons in the Tibet Autonomous Region
 Nangpa La shooting incident
 Protests and uprisings in Tibet since 1950
 Sinicization of Tibet
 Tibetan sovereignty debate
 Hacking of Dalai Lama's emails led to discovery by Canadians of embassy hacking worldwide by Chinese government spy networks.

References

External links
Official site
UN General Assembly Resolution 1723 (XVI) of 1961 on the question of Tibet
 Tibetan Monk Palden Gyatso in Conversation with Annie Lennox, 1998

Tibetan activists
Tibet freedom activists
Politics of Tibet
Human rights organizations
Human rights organisations based in India